Purple sweet potato haupia pie is a Hawaiian dish that incorporates purple sweet potatoes and haupia. It is similar to the sweet potato pie that originated in the Southern United States. This dish however, often uses Okinawan sweet potatoes which are purple in color. It has three layers. The bottom layer is a macadamia nut crust. The middle layer is the Okinawan sweet potato portion. The top layer is a haupia topping, which is added when the bottom two layers are cooled to prevent it from being runny. The Okinawan sweet potatoes are distinct in flavor and texture to other types of sweet potatoes, so it cannot be substituted without affecting the final outcome. The sweet potatoes need to be cooked thoroughly in order to become sweet and turn deep purple. The dessert is very rich, and it is made at any time of the year.

See also
Sweet potato pie
 List of sweet potato dishes

References

Hawaiian desserts
Sweet pies
Sweet potatoes